
Gmina Lidzbark Warmiński is a rural gmina (administrative district) in Lidzbark County, Warmian-Masurian Voivodeship, in northern Poland. Its seat is the town of Lidzbark Warmiński, although the town is not part of the territory of the gmina.

Villages
Gmina Lidzbark Warmiński contains the villages and settlements of Babiak, Blanki, Bobrownik, Budniki, Bugi, Chełm, Długołęka, Drwęca, Gajlity, Grabniak, Ignalin, Jagodów, Jagoty, Jarandowo, Kaszuny, Kierz, Kłębowo, Kłusity Wielkie, Knipy, Kochanówka, Koniewo, Koniewo-Osada, Kotowo, Krasny Bór, Kraszewo, Łabno, Łaniewo, Łaniewo-Leśniczówka, Lauda, Markajmy, Marków, Medyny, Miejska Wola, Miłogórze, Morawa, Nowa Wieś Wielka, Nowosady, Pilnik, Pomorowo, Redy, Redy-Osada, Rogóż, Runowo, Sarnowo, Stabunity, Stryjkowo, Suryty, Swajnie, Świętnik, Tremlak, Widryki, Wielochowo, Workiejmy, Wróblik, Zaręby, Zwierzyniec and Żytowo.

Neighbouring gminas
Gmina Lidzbark Warmiński is bordered by the town of Lidzbark Warmiński and by the gminas of Bartoszyce, Dobre Miasto, Górowo Iławeckie, Jeziorany, Kiwity, Lubomino, Orneta and Pieniężno.

References
Polish official population figures 2006

Lidzbark Warminski
Lidzbark County